Three Roads to Quantum Gravity: A New Understanding of Space, Time and the Universe is a non-fiction book by American theoretical physicist Lee Smolin. The book was initially published on May 30, 2001 by Basic Books as a part of the Science Masters series.

Overview
Smolin discusses three potential approaches by which a unified theory of quantum gravity, arguably the foremost issue in theoretical physics, may be realized.  Approaches discussed include string theory, M-theory, and Smolin's preferred approach, loop quantum gravity.  Smolin suggests that these approaches may be approximations of a single, underlying theory.

Review

—The Guardian

See also
 Background independence
 Quantum mechanics
 Quantum gravity
 Loop quantum gravity
 M-theory
 String theory
 Topos theory

References

External links
 

2001 non-fiction books
Basic Books books
Books by Lee Smolin
English-language books
Popular physics books
String theory books